Paratelmatobius gaigeae (common name: Gaige's rapids frog) is a species of frog in the family Leptodactylidae. It is endemic to Serra da Bocaina, a part of Serra do Mar, southeastern Brazil. Paratelmatobius gaigeae is named after Helen Beulah Thompson Gaige, an American herpetologist.

Its natural habitats are montane forests. It is a terrestrial frog that probably breeds in temporary ponds or streams. It is threatened by habitat loss; logging might have already caused extirpation of this species from its type locality, Bonito in the Serra da Bocaina.

References

gaigeae
Endemic fauna of Brazil
Amphibians of Brazil
Taxa named by Doris Mable Cochran
Taxonomy articles created by Polbot
Amphibians described in 1938